The Triangular 99 was a short international women's rugby tournament held in New Zealand at the end of 1999. It featured the winner and runner up from the previous year's World Cup (New Zealand and the USA), plus Canada. It was won easily by the hosts.

Final table

Results

References

1999 rugby union tournaments for national teams
International women's rugby union competitions hosted by New Zealand
1999 in New Zealand rugby union
1999 in women's rugby union
1999 in Canadian women's sports
1999 in American women's sports
rugby union
October 1999 sports events in New Zealand